The Prospect Hotel, also known as the A. H. Boothby House, in Prospect, Oregon, is two-story hotel listed on the National Register of Historic Places. Built in 1892 as a private home, it was added to the register in 1980.

Located on the community's main street, Mill Creek Drive, the hotel and several tourist cabins occupy a  site near the Prospect School and Prospect Store. The hotel is a short distance from Oregon Route 62, the main highway from Medford to Crater Lake. The L-shaped building with four large gables has a  veranda, added in about 1915, that extends from three sides of the main building. The rear of the hotel includes a shed addition.

Called the Boothby House by its original owner, it was turned into a hotel for people traveling by wagon to Crater Lake in the last decade of the 19th century. During the first two decades of the 20th century, the hotel evolved into a tourist stop for automobile travelers. Guests who signed the register included William Jennings Bryan, Zane Grey, Joaquin Miller, and Jack London.

See also
 National Register of Historic Places listings in Jackson County, Oregon

References

1892 establishments in Oregon
Buildings and structures in Jackson County, Oregon
Hotel buildings completed in 1892
Hotel buildings on the National Register of Historic Places in Oregon
Houses completed in 1892
National Register of Historic Places in Jackson County, Oregon